Greatest Hits is a compilation album by English singer-songwriter David Gray, released on 12 November 2007 in the UK and a day later in the US. Greatest Hits contains songs from his first album, A Century Ends in 1993, through to his 2005 album Life in Slow Motion, and includes two new songs: the first single "You're the World to Me" and "Destroyer." In interviews, Gray has described the new single "You're the World to Me" as "joyous" and "unselfconscious," and called his Greatest Hits album "a bag of happy shit".

All tracks are the original album versions, except for "Be Mine," which is the single remix; "Babylon," which is a new mix; and "Shine." Due to record company issues, the original recording of "Shine" could not be used; instead, a live recording from Gray's concert DVD Live in Slow Motion is featured on the compilation.

The Japanese pressing of the CD contains two bonus tracks, while Barnes & Noble released an exclusive version with a bonus disc containing two rare live covers – "One of the Birds" by Will Oldham and "Morning of My Life" by the Bee Gees (retitled "In the Morning"), previously only available as a digital download from the compilation album A Thousand Miles Behind (2007).

As of November 2016, the album has sold 353,936 copies in the UK.

Track listing

Charts

Weekly charts

Year-end charts

Certifications and sales

References

David Gray (musician) albums
2007 greatest hits albums
Atlantic Records compilation albums
ATO Records albums
IHT Records albums